Juchao District was a district in Anhui Province, People's Republic of China, under the jurisdiction of Chaohu City. The government of Chaohu City is located in the Juchao District.

Juchao District has jurisdiction over five subdistricts, fifteen towns and two townships.

On August 22, 2011, Anhui province government announced that Chaohu was split into three parts and was absorbed by neighboring cities. Juchao District was renamed to Chaohu as a county-level city under Hefei's administration.

References

County-level divisions of Anhui